Coptotettix is an Asian genus of ground-hoppers (Orthoptera: Caelifera) in the subfamily Tetriginae.

Species have been recorded from Africa, Asia (India, Sri Lanka, southern China, Indo-China, Malesia) and eastern Australia.

Species 
The Catalogue of Life lists:
Coptotettix abidjanensis Günther, 1979
Coptotettix alfurus Günther, 1937
Coptotettix annandalei Hancock, 1915
Coptotettix annulipes Karsch, 1890
Coptotettix asperatus Bolívar, 1887 - type species
Coptotettix bannaensis Zheng, 2006
Coptotettix beihaiensis Deng & Zheng, 2006
Coptotettix bilineatus Bolívar, 1905
Coptotettix brachynota Deng, Zheng & Wei, 2007
Coptotettix brachypterus Zheng, Lin & Zhang, 2013
Coptotettix cangshanensis Zheng, Nie & He, 2005
Coptotettix capitatus Bolívar, 1887
Coptotettix circinihumerus Zheng & Deng, 2004
Coptotettix conspersus Hancock, 1915
Coptotettix convexus Hancock, 1910
Coptotettix curvimarginus Zheng, Shi & Luo, 2003
Coptotettix darlingtoni Rehn, 1952
Coptotettix diyalensis Ingrisch & Garai, 2001
Coptotettix emeiensis Zheng, Lin & Zhang, 2012
Coptotettix fangchengensis Zheng & Jiang, 2002
Coptotettix ferrugineus Bolívar, 1887
Coptotettix fossulatus Bolívar, 1887
Coptotettix fretorum Rehn, 1952
Coptotettix fuliginosus Bolívar, 1887
Coptotettix fuscus Bolívar, 1887
Coptotettix gibbus Sjöstedt, 1936
Coptotettix gongshanensis Zheng, 1992
Coptotettix guangzhouensis Zheng, 2012
Coptotettix guinanensis Deng & Zheng, 2006
Coptotettix hechiensis Zheng & Deng, 2004
Coptotettix huanjiangensis Zheng & Jiang, 1994
Coptotettix indicus Hancock, 1912
Coptotettix insularis Günther, 1935
Coptotettix interruptus Bolívar, 1887
Coptotettix jianfengensis Zheng, 2012
 Coptotettix korbensis Gupta & Chandra, 2017
Coptotettix lacernosus Rehn, 1952
Coptotettix latifemurus Zheng & Ou, 2010
Coptotettix latifrons Brunner von Wattenwyl, 1893
Coptotettix lohitensis Shishodia, 1991
Coptotettix longjiangensis Zheng & Wei, 2000
Coptotettix longtanensis Zheng & Jiang, 2004
Coptotettix maesoi Bolívar, 1887
Coptotettix manipurensis Shishodia, 1991
Coptotettix mastrucatus Rehn, 1952
Coptotettix mazarredoi Bolívar, 1887
Coptotettix minhouensis Zheng & Li, 2001
Coptotettix minutus Bolívar, 1905
Coptotettix modiglianii Bolívar, 1898
Coptotettix muglingi Ingrisch, 2001
Coptotettix orthomarginis Zheng, 2012
Coptotettix parvus Hancock, 1907
Coptotettix planus Bolívar, 1887
Coptotettix prominemarginis Deng, Zheng & Wei, 2007
Coptotettix quinquecarinatus Sjöstedt, 1932
Coptotettix retractus Hancock, 1915
Coptotettix rotundatus Hancock, 1907
Coptotettix rufipes Bolívar, 1887
Coptotettix rugosus Hancock, 1904
Coptotettix rupticosta Zheng & Ou, 2004
Coptotettix sauteri Günther, 1941
Coptotettix spicupennis Zeng & Zheng, 2010
Coptotettix strigatus Rehn, 1952
Coptotettix testaceus Bolívar, 1887
Coptotettix torulidosalis Ou, 2011
Coptotettix transimaculatus Zheng & Jiang, 2002
Coptotettix tricarinatus Shishodia, 1991
Coptotettix tristis Günther, 1935
Coptotettix tuberculatus Bolívar, 1887
Coptotettix undulatimarginis Zheng, Nie & He, 2005
Coptotettix zaujiangensis Zheng & Jiang, 2006

References

External links 
 

Tetrigidae
Caelifera genera
Orthoptera of Asia
Orthoptera of Africa